David Home (1558–1629) was a Scottish historian.

David Home may also refer to:

David Milne-Home (1805–1890),  Scottish advocate, geologist and meteorologist
David Milne Home (politician) (1838–1901), British soldier and Conservative politician
David Douglas-Home, 15th Earl of Home (born 1943), British businessman and Conservative politician
Sir David Home, 1st Baronet (died 1650) of the Home baronets
Sir David George Home, 13th Baronet (1904–1992) of the Home baronets

See also
David Hume (disambiguation)
Home (surname)